Steven W. Kraus (born July 28, 1959) was the Representative of the 89th district of the Ohio House of Representatives until his felony conviction on July 27, 2015. He attended the Community College of the Air Force of Air University before receiving his bachelor's in engineering from Troy University.

Kraus' election was also significant due to his defeat of Chris Redfern, a long-serving state representative and the Chairman of the Ohio Democratic Party at the time. After winning election, but prior to his swearing in, Kraus was indicted on felony charges of burglary, breaking and entering, and theft. Kraus was convicted of a fifth-degree felony on July 27, 2015, and, according to the Ohio Revised Code, immediately relinquished his seat as a result of his conviction.

Kraus wrote a book published in February 2018, Checkmate: One Man's Fight Against Political Corruption.

Bibliography 

 Checkmate: One Man's Fight Against Political Corruption by Steve Kraus (2018) , autobiography describing Steve Kraus's conviction.

References

1959 births
Living people
Republican Party members of the Ohio House of Representatives
Ohio politicians convicted of crimes
Politicians from Sandusky, Ohio
Troy University alumni
Candidates in the 2018 United States elections